The 39th edition of the annual Clásico RCN was held from August 13 to August 22, 1999, in Colombia. The stage race with an UCI rate of 2.4 started in Villa de Leyva and finished in Medellín.

Stages

1999-08-13: Villa de Leyva (3.6 km)

1999-08-14: Villa de Leyva — Barbosa (158 km)

1999-08-15: Moniquirá — Tocancipá (160 km)

1999-08-16: Bogotá — Alto de Patios (22.6 km)

1999-08-17: Madrid — Ibagué (196 km)

1999-08-18: Ibagué — Roldanillo (152 km)

1999-08-19: Roldanillo — Armenia (127 km)

1999-08-20: Pereira — Manizales (210 km)

1999-08-21: Manizales — Medellín (185.8 km)

1999-08-22: Medellín Circuit Race (120 km)

Final classification

See also 
 1999 Vuelta a Colombia

References 
 cyclingnews

Clásico RCN
Clasico RCN
Clasico RCN
August 1999 sports events in South America